Custer Township may refer to:
 Custer Township, Will County, Illinois
 Custer Township, Decatur County, Kansas
 Custer Township, Mitchell County, Kansas, in Mitchell County, Kansas
 Custer Township, Antrim County, Michigan
 Custer Township, Mason County, Michigan
 Custer Township, Sanilac County, Michigan
 Custer Township, Lyon County, Minnesota
 Custer Township, Antelope County, Nebraska
 Custer Township, Custer County, Nebraska
 Custer Township, Morton County, North Dakota
 Custer Township, Beadle County, South Dakota, in Beadle County, South Dakota
 Custer Township, Corson County, South Dakota, in Corson County, South Dakota

Township name disambiguation pages